The Superior Court of Pennsylvania is one of two Pennsylvania intermediate appellate courts (the other being the Commonwealth Court of Pennsylvania). It is based in Harrisburg.

Jurisdiction 
The Superior Court hears appeals in criminal and most civil cases from the Courts of Common Pleas and on matters involving children and families. Most appeals are decided on the submission of briefs only.  However, when the parties request oral argument, those sessions are usually heard by panels of three judges sitting in Philadelphia, Harrisburg, or Pittsburgh, but the court also hears some appeals "en banc," i.e., with nine judges. Sometimes, special argument panels sit in other counties around the Commonwealth.  Although different panels of three judges may sit to hear appeals, there is only one Superior Court (that is, Pennsylvania is not divided into appellate territories).

Superior Court Judges 
Superior Court judges are elected in statewide elections.  The term of a Superior Court Judge is 10 years.  After serving 10 years, judges may hold their seats if they win a retention vote.  Voters have the right to retain or reject (vote out of office) Superior Court judges in Pennsylvania.  Superior Court judges must retire from active service at the age of 75.  They may serve as Senior Judges though, as approved by the Pennsylvania Supreme Court.

Commissioned judges

Vacancies and pending nominations

Senior judges

See also

References

External links
Superior Court of Pennsylvania
Unified Judicial System of Pennsylvania
Superior Court Judges
Recent Superior Court of Pennsylvania Cases by Judge and Topic

Pennsylvania state courts
Pennsylvania
Pennsylvania
Courts and tribunals with year of establishment missing